Charles Jonathan Penrose Tennyson (born 11 May 1955)    is a British physicist. He is the Massey Professor of Physics (since 2005) and Head of department at the Department of Physics and Astronomy, University College London (2004–11). Chief Scientist Quantemol Ltd and chair, Blue Skies Space Ltd.

Education
He was educated at Bootham School, York. He continued his studies at King's College, Cambridge and the University of Sussex.

Research and career
Tennyson is an author of over 700 scientific papers focusing on applications of molecular spectroscopy to problems in astrophysics, atmospheric science, plasma physics and other fields. He has written a number of popular science articles. He wrote the undergraduate textbook Astronomical Spectroscopy: An Introduction to the Atomic and Molecular Physics of Astronomical Spectra (2005). Leader of the ExoMol project.

Awards and honours 
Tennyson was elected a Fellow of the Royal Society (FRS) in 2009.

Personal life
He is the son of Hallam Tennyson, grandson of Sir Charles Tennyson and is the great-great-grandson of Alfred Lord Tennyson. He is the father of actor Matthew Tennyson.

References

1955 births
Living people
British physicists
Academics of University College London
British people of German descent
Fellows of the Royal Society
People from Hitchin
People educated at Bootham School
Jonathan